The 1914–15 Vancouver Millionaires season was the fourth season of the professional men's ice hockey Vancouver Millionaires team of the Pacific Coast Hockey Association league. The Millionaires were the PCHA champions. After the season the club faced off against the Ottawa Senators, NHA champions for the Stanley Cup. The Millionaires won the series to become the first west-coast team to win the Cup. This was the first time that a team from Vancouver won the Stanley Cup.

Regular season

Final standings
Note: W = Wins, L = Losses, T = Ties, GF= Goals For, GA = Goals against

Schedule and results

a Cancelled

A game between Vancouver and Victoria was cancelled at the end of the season.

Source: Coleman, p. 271

Player statistics

Goaltending averages

Lehman led the PCHA in goals against average and shutouts.

Scoring leaders

Taylor led the PCHA in points and assists, and MacKay led the PCHA in goals.

Playoffs

In the second "world series" of ice hockey, the Millionaires played the Ottawa Senators, NHA champions. Vancouver won the best-of-five series in three games and became the first west-coast team to win the Cup.

Vancouver Millionaires 1915 Stanley Cup champions

See also
1914–15 PCHA season

References

Van
Van
Vancouver Millionaires
Stanley Cup championship seasons